Ralph Degnan Hough (born May 21, 1943) is an American politician who served as acting governor of New Hampshire for roughly a week in January 1993. Though now a registered Democrat, he was a Republican during his time in state government.

Hough was born in Hanover, New Hampshire in 1943. He served as President of the New Hampshire Senate from 1993 to 1994. Governor Judd Gregg resigned from office January 2, 1993, in order to take his seat in the United States Senate. Governor-elect Steve Merrill's term as governor did not begin until January 7 in accordance to the Constitution of New Hampshire, therefore Hough, as first in line of succession to the gubernatorial powers and duties, served as acting governor for five days. In 1994, he was defeated for re-nomination to his senate seat in the Republican primary by Jim Rubens.

References

1943 births
20th-century American politicians
Republican Party governors of New Hampshire
Living people
Republican Party New Hampshire state senators
Presidents of the New Hampshire Senate